Matthew Clyde Ellis (born May 1965) was the Conservative Staffordshire Police and Crime Commissioner. He was the first person to be elected the post on 15 November 2012.

References

Police and crime commissioners in England
Living people
1965 births
Conservative Party police and crime commissioners